Doris Roberta Merrick (nee Simpson,  June 6, 1919 – November 30, 2019) was an American film actress and model.

Biography
Merrick was born in June 1919, to Joseph Simpson and Nellie Weber, and had five brothers and four sisters. She attended Hyde Park High School and worked as a singer with her sisters, before becoming a soloist at NBC, she subsequently worked as a model before signing a contract with Warner Bros. in 1941. She was first given the name Beth Drake but changed to Doris Merrick not long after. After appearing in an uncredited role in Yankee Doodle Dandy, starring James Cagney, in 1941, she made her star film debut the following year in Girl Trouble. While a couple of her roles went uncredited she had a notable supporting role in the Laurel and Hardy comedy The Big Noise (1944). She appeared in the magazine Yank, the Army Weekly during the WWII years and her professional acting career ended in 1955. She was married to boxer Max Marek from 1936 to 1944, before being married to rancher and lumberman John Meagher Knoll from 1946 to 1962. Merrick lived in the Golden Valley Estates Assisted Living Centre in Yuma, Arizona and was going under her married name of Doris Hatfield. Merrick turned 100 in June 2019 and died in November.

Filmography 
Yankee Doodle Dandy (1942) Uncredited
Girl Trouble (1942) as Susan
That Other Woman (1942) as Irene
Time to Kill (1942) as Linda Conquest Murdock
Heaven Can Wait (1943) as Nellie Brown (uncredited)
Ladies of Washington (1944) as Susan
In the Meantime, Darling (1944) as Mrs. MacAndrews
The Big Noise (1944) as Evelyn
Sensation Hunters (1945) as Julie Rogers
This Love of Ours (1945) as Vivian
Hit the Hay (1945) as Sally Mansfield
Child of Divorce (1946) as Louise Norman
The Pilgrim Lady (1947) as Millicent Rankin
The Counterfeiters (1948) as Margo Talbot
The Fighting Stallion (1950) as Jeanne Barton
Untamed Women (1952) as Sandra
The Neanderthal Man (1953) as Ruth Marshall
Interrupted Melody (1955) as nurse (uncredited)

References

External links
 
 
 

1919 births
2019 deaths
20th-century American actresses
American centenarians
American film actresses
American television actresses
Women centenarians
21st-century American women